NSGC may stand for:

 National Society of Genetic Counselors
 Nova Scotia Gaming Corporation